Cannabis in Mauritius is illegal; locally it is known as gandia.

History
Cannabis was banned in the British colony of Mauritius in 1840:

Usage
A 1974 report on addiction noted that cannabis was usually smoked in cigarette rolls or clay pipes, but was mixed into cakes or sweets, or the beverage bhang. The writer noted it was rarely sniffed as snuff as "it burns the nose".

Reform
In February 1999, a rally was held calling for legalization of cannabis. The famed Mauritian musician Kaya performed, and publicly smoked cannabis at the event. He was detained by police, and four days later died in custody.

References

Further reading
CANNABIS SATIVA ADDICTION IN MAURITIUS Dr. A. C. Raman. 

Mauritius
Drugs in Mauritius
Mauritius